Another Day is an album by the Dutch rock band Racoon. It was first released on 9 April 2005.

Track listing
"Happy Family"
"Hero's in Town"
"Love You More"
"Laugh About It"
"Blow Your Tears"
"Couple of guys"
"Got to Get Out"
"Brother"
"Kingsize"
"Lose Another Day"
"If You Know What I Mean"
"Walk Away"
"Hanging with the Clowns"

(May contain swear words)

Charts

Weekly charts

Year-end charts

References

Racoon (band) albums
2005 albums